German submarine U-741 was a Type VIIC U-boat built by F Schichau GmbH of Danzig and commissioned on 10 April 1943.

Design
German Type VIIC submarines were preceded by the shorter Type VIIB submarines. U-741 had a displacement of  when at the surface and  while submerged. She had two shafts and two  propellers.

U-741 was fitted with five  torpedo tubes (four fitted at the bow and one at the stern), fourteen torpedoes, one  SK C/35 naval gun, 220 rounds, and two twin  C/30 anti-aircraft guns. The boat had a complement of between forty-four and sixty.

Service history
On 5 July 1944, U-741 departed Brest under the protection of 4 Vorpostenboot escort trawlers. Escort Group 12, Royal Canadian Navy, detected the German force on radar and intercepted it, engaging in the vicinity of the Pierres Noires lighthouse (Battle of Pierres Noires) in the late evening. U-741 managed to escape, but one of the German escorts was sunk.

On 15 August 1944, she attacked convoy FTM-69 and torpedoed the Royal Navy Tank Landing ship , 35 miles South East of St. Catherine's Point causing extensive damage and seven fatalities. Although the vessel was beached, she later broke in two and was declared a total loss. Convoy escorts counter-attacked; the corvette  is credited with the destruction of U-741. Orchis rescued one survivor.

The wreck was identified by marine archaeologist Innes McCartney in 2000 near the position given by the Allies.

In five patrols U-741 accounted for the total loss of one warship, for a total of 1,625 tons.

Wolfpacks
U-741 took part in six wolfpacks, namely:
 Coronel 1 (14 – 17 December 1943) 
 Sylt (18 – 23 December 1943) 
 Rügen 2 (23 – 28 December 1943) 
 Rügen 1 (28 December 1943 – 7 January 1944) 
 Rügen (7 – 14 January 1944) 
 Preussen (7 – 22 March 1944)

Summary of raiding history

References

Notes

Citations

Bibliography

External links

1943 ships
Ships built by Schichau
Ships built in Danzig
German Type VIIC submarines
U-boats commissioned in 1943
U-boats sunk by British warships
U-boats sunk in 1944
World War II shipwrecks in the English Channel
World War II submarines of Germany
Maritime incidents in August 1944